Childhood education may refer to:

Early childhood education, the education of children from infancy until around eight
Primary education, the education of children up until around 16, including elementary and junior high schools
Secondary education, the education of children up until around 18, including high schools